Fruit Salad is a type of "raspberry & pineapple flavour chew" according to its packaging. It is a chewy confectionery. Fruit Salad is manufactured by Barratt in Spain.

While still manufactured under Tangerine Confectionery, Fruit Salad chews were rebranded from Barratt to 'Candy Land' and the packaging, most notably the outer box, had been redesigned. They have since reverted back to the Barratt brand.

From 2019 the fruit salad sweet no longer contains gelatine and is suitable for vegetarians.

Nutrition facts
Nutritional Information
Per 100g - Energy 1680 kJ (395 kcal), Protein 0.8g, Carbohydrate 84.1g, Fat 6.1g.
Per Chew - Energy 50 kJ (10 kcal), Protein 0g, Carbohydrate 2.4g, Fat 0.2g.

Ingredients
Glucose syrup, sugar, hydrogenated vegetable fat, citric acid, emulsifier (soya lecithin), flavourings, colours (E104, E124, E122).

Each chew weighs 2.6g, and each pack contains 15 chews.

See also
 Black Jack (confectionery)

Brand name confectionery
Yorkshire cuisine
British confectionery